High Note is a 1960 American animated short film directed by Chuck Jones and written by Michael Maltese.  It was originally released by Warner Bros. Pictures on December 3, 1960 as part of the Looney Tunes series. It features no dialogue, relying solely on the animation and music to carry the plot. It was nominated for an Academy Award for Best Short Film (Cartoon) in 1961, losing to Gene Deitch's Munro.

Plot
Various musical notes set up sheet music in preparation for a performance of "The Blue Danube." As the music begins, however, it becomes apparent that a note is missing. The note (a red-faced "High Note") is revealed to be drunk, staggering out of the "Little Brown Jug" sheet music.

The irritated music-note conductor chases the intoxicated note, intending to put him back in his place so the waltz can properly continue. Throughout the pursuit, many objects are created from the simple musical notes: a dog, a slide, a clothes hanger, a lasso, horses, and more. Eventually, the rogue note is put back into place, but is again missing when the performance starts over. This time, though, the balance of the remaining music is also gone. The conductor discovers that all the notes have gone into the "Little Brown Jug" to get drunk. The original High Note, who is in Irving Berlin's "How Dry I Am," replaces the "I" with "We."

Soundtrack
 "The Blue Danube" - Johann Strauss II
 "How Dry I Am" - Irving Berlin
 "Little Brown Jug" - Joseph Winner
 Brahms' Lullaby - Johannes Brahms
 "Where, Oh Where, Has My Little Dog Gone?" - Septimus Winner

Reception
Animation historian Jerry Beck writes, "In today's world, where vintage cartoons are typically mistaken for children's fare, masterpieces like High Note set the record straight — with a healthy dose of classically adult booze humor."

Home media
This short is featured as part of the Looney Tunes: Musical Masterpieces DVD, as well as Disc 2 of the Looney Tunes Platinum Collection: Volume 3 set.

See also
 List of American films of 1960

References

External links
 
 

1960 films
1960 animated films
1960 short films
1960 musical films
1960s Warner Bros. animated short films
Looney Tunes shorts
Short films directed by Chuck Jones
American musical films
Films scored by Milt Franklyn
Animated films without speech
Films with screenplays by Michael Maltese
1960s English-language films